The Elmwood Historic District encompasses two large residential sections of the Elmwood neighborhood of Providence, Rhode Island.  The Elmwood area was mainly farmland until the mid-19th century, when its development as a residential area began, and these two sections represents well-preserved neighborhoods developed between about 1850 and 1920.  The district was listed on the National Register of Historic Places in 1980.

The northern enclave of the district is roughly bounded by Elmwood Avenue on the west, and extends east along Whitmarsh Street and Princeton Avenue most of the way to Broad Street.  It also includes the western half of the blocks of Moore, Dabol, and Mawney Streets adjacent to Elmwood, as well as the Knight Memorial Library, which is the neighborhood's finest public structure.  This area features a concentration of Second Empire houses along Moore, Dabol, and Mawney, and Queen Anne and Colonial Revival houses on Princeton and Whitmarsh.

The southern enclave is also bounded on the west by Elmwood Avenue, and extends from Congress Avenue to Adelaide Avenue, including Columbus Square, where there is a separately-listed statue of Christopher Columbus.  It extends eastward on Adelaide as far as Emerson Street, and along the other side streets to the far side of Melrose Street.  This area is characterized by late 19th-century and early 20th century construction, predominantly Queen Anne and Colonial Revival in style.  Lot sizes are more generous than those in the northern section.

See also

National Register of Historic Places listings in Providence, Rhode Island

References

Historic districts in Providence County, Rhode Island
Geography of Providence, Rhode Island
National Register of Historic Places in Providence, Rhode Island
Historic districts on the National Register of Historic Places in Rhode Island